Cephalosphaera germanica is a species of fly in the family Pipunculidae.

Distribution
Sweden, England, Netherlands, Germany.

References

Pipunculidae
Insects described in 1940
Diptera of Europe